Commissioned logistic and support vessels of the Royal New Zealand Navy from its formation on 1 October 1941 to the present:

See also
 Current Royal New Zealand Navy ships
 List of ships of the Royal New Zealand Navy

References
 McDougall, R J  (1989) New Zealand Naval Vessels. Page 111–114. Government Printing Office. 
 Royal New Zealand Navy Official web site

Auxiliary ships of the Royal New Zealand Navy
Military history of New Zealand
Royal New Zealand Navy